NASA FACTS was a collection of NASA's science series which is intended as an "easy-to-understand explanations of scientific phenomena involved in projects undertaken by NASA. The NASA FACTS Science Series was published frequently at irregular intervals, each presenting "an analysis of a particular subject within program perimeters and scientific disciplines of interest to NASA".

External links 

NASA online